Martin Bleimann (also Martin Baltin; 4 April 1886 Paatsalu Parish (now Lääneranna Parish), Kreis Wiek – 1938, Soviet Union) was an Estonian politician. He was a member of I Riigikogu, representing the Estonian Independent Socialist Workers' Party. On 14 December 1921, he resigned his position and he was replaced by Kustas Köidam.

References

1886 births
1938 deaths
People from Lääneranna Parish
People from Kreis Wiek
Estonian Independent Socialist Workers' Party politicians
Members of the Riigikogu, 1920–1923
Estonian emigrants to the Soviet Union
Great Purge victims from Estonia